Konstantinos Tampas (born 14 April 1999) is a Greek professional footballer who plays as a right-back for Super League 2 club Apollon Smyrnis.

References

1999 births
Living people
Greece youth international footballers
Football League (Greece) players
Gamma Ethniki players
Kalamata F.C. players
Enosi Panaspropyrgiakou Doxas players
Association football defenders
Footballers from Athens
Greek footballers